The Winners Open is a tennis event located in Cluj-Napoca, Romania. The first edition of the tournament was held in August 2021. It forms as part of the WTA Tour and is classed as a WTA 250 tournament.

The tournament is held at the Winners Sports Club on clay courts.

Past finals

Singles

Doubles

See also
 Transylvania Open
 Bucharest Open
 Romanian Open
 List of tennis tournaments

References

External links
 Official site
 Winners Sports Club

WTA Tour
Tennis tournaments in Romania
Sport in Cluj-Napoca
Clay court tennis tournaments
2021 establishments in Romania
Recurring sporting events established in 2021
August sporting events